Rex Andrew Sinquefield (born September 7, 1944) is an American businessman, investor, and philanthropist who has been called an "index-fund pioneer" for creating the first passively managed index fund open to the general public. Sinquefield was also a co-founder of Dimensional Fund Advisors. He is active in Missouri politics.

Early life and education
He had 18 cleft palate operations before age five. His father died when he was five years old. Sinquefield and his brother were placed in a local Catholic orphanage, the Saint Vincent Home for Children in St. Louis, Missouri. Sinquefield told the BBC that the school's regimentation taught him self-discipline. When they were teenagers, Sinquefield and his brother returned home to live with their mother.

He graduated from Bishop DuBourg High School in 1962. He studied to be a priest at the Diocesan Seminary at Cardinal Glennon College in St. Louis. During the Vietnam War, he served as a “high-end gopher” in the finance corps at Fort Riley, as he put it.” He majored in business for his undergraduate degree from Saint Louis University and received an MBA from University of Chicago.

Career 
Sinquefield worked at the American National Bank of Chicago, developing, in 1973, the first S&P 500 passively managed index fund. Due to high transaction costs at the time and low-liquidity for many smaller company stocks, Sinquefield did not initially buy all 500 stocks listed in the S&P 500, but he was able to nonetheless closely track the index. After seven years, the fund managed $12 billion.

In May 1974, in the depths of the worst bear market since the 1930s, Sinquefield and Roger Ibbotson made a brash prediction: The Dow Jones Industrial Average, floundering in the 800s at the time, would hit 9,218 in 1998 and 10,000 by November 1999. He was spot on.

Dimensional Fund Advisors 

In 1981, Sinquefield and another University of Chicago teaching assistant, David Booth, co-founded Dimensional Fund Advisors, the first passive fund focused on small (microcap) companies customarily ignored in large institutional portfolios. As of June 30, 2018, it managed more than $582 billion in assets.

With Yale School of Management professor Roger G. Ibbotson, he co-wrote the 1989 book Stocks, Bonds, Bills and Inflation, a study of stock market returns.

Dimensional Fund Advisors' investment strategy has been said to create an optimal portfolio consisting of various funds that emulate the different style and size attributes of various securities markets worldwide so that one fund might behave like the S&P 500, another might correlate with just the value stocks in the S&P 500, while a third might emulate the performance of all small-cap stocks. Sinquefield is a proponent of passive investment, meaning that he believes you simply cannot beat the market.

In 2005, he retired from DFA because he was “bored” and returned to St. Louis, where he became involved in politics and philanthropy.

Politics

Show-Me Institute 

On his return to St. Louis, Sinquefield co-founded the Show-Me Institute with R. Crosby Kemper III, a Kansas City banker. Based in Clayton, Show-Me is a think tank that commissions studies on public-policy issues. It has been labeled libertarian, conservative, and free-market. He is president of the institute, whose motto is “Advancing liberty with responsibility by promoting market solutions for Missouri public policy.”

Show-Me has successfully lobbied for a cable franchise reform bill and HB 818, which made Missouri the first state to let employers contribute pretax dollars to employees' health-savings accounts. Show-Me has also opposed governments' use of eminent domain.

Campaign contributions 
Sinquefield became a major financial contributor to political campaigns of both political parties in Missouri politics after the Missouri legislature ended campaign finance limits in 2009. According to a 2015 Governing Magazine article, "big majorities" in both houses of the Missouri legislature have received campaign contributions from Sinquefield. He has particularly focused on altering public education, tax reform, and accountability in government.

He donated $1 million to Republican Bev Randles' 2016 campaign for Lieutenant Governor of Missouri and three quarters of a million to Kurt Schaefer, a Republican candidate for attorney general. Both candidates lost.

Sinquefield has also donated to Missouri candidates Shane Schoeller, Chris Koster, and Sarah Steelman, as well as to the 2016 gubernatorial campaign of Catherine Hanaway.

In 2014, he supported a ballot initiative to abolish teacher tenure in Missouri and he is a major funder of other groups and PACs, such as Pelopidas, LLC.

Rex and Jeanne are supporters of Senator Josh Hawley with significant contributions to his campaign in 2020. Sinquefield also donated to Mike Parson that year.

In 2021, Sinquefield donated $250,000 to two campaigns: Scott Fitzpatrick's bid for state auditor and Mike Kehoe's prospective candidacy for governor in 2024.

Tax policy activism

Many of Sinquefield's efforts in recent years have been focused on changing tax policy in Missouri. He advocates eliminating the state's income tax and replacing it with a more comprehensive sales tax. Sinquefield advocates replacing Missouri's and Kansas' income tax with a state sales tax on things like childcare, restaurants, and hotels.

Sinquefield also gave money to the group Kansans for No Income Tax which helped governor Sam Brownback lower the state income tax in 2012. Dubbed the Kansas experiment, this policy decreased state revenues by hundreds of millions of dollars; caused spending on roads, bridges, and education to be slashed; and failed to lift Kansas' below-average economic growth. In 2017, the Republican-controlled Legislature of Kansas voted to roll back the cuts and overrode Brownback's veto.

Sinquefield also has repeatedly backed measures to repeal the earnings taxes of St. Louis and Kansas City, Missouri.

He is the primary financial supporter of the Let Voters Decide committee. In 2010, the committee placed a statewide initiative on the Missouri ballot. Called Proposition A, it would prevent all Missouri communities except Kansas City and St. Louis from imposing earnings taxes. It would also allow Kansas City and St. Louis voters to vote on whether to retain their earnings taxes. Missourians passed proposition A with a large margin – 68.4% YES / 31.6% NO (1,294,911 YES votes to 598,010 NO votes).

On January 5, 2011, Let Voters Decide submitted nine initiative petitions to the Missouri Secretary of State calling for a repeal of the state's income tax – with a top rate of six percent. The petitions also called for a higher sales tax, capped at seven percent, that would be applied to virtually any good or service transaction involving individuals. Sinquefield and Let Voters Decide President Travis Brown say that replacing the income tax with a sales tax would help create jobs, promote economic development and make state revenue collection less volatile. In 2014, Missouri lowered its income tax rate.

Local control of St. Louis Metropolitan Police Department
Sinquefield supported the successful effort to return local control of the St. Louis Metropolitan Police Department to the City of St. Louis. Since 1861, the police department had been run by a five-person board that included four gubernatorial appointees.

Sinquefield donated $300,000 to "A Safer Missouri", a group supporting the campaign for local control. A Safer Missouri endorsed state legislation in favor of local control, along with a ballot initiative filed with the Missouri Secretary of State, which will be pursued if the legislative efforts fail, according to a spokeswoman for A Safer Missouri. The ballot initiative was filed and entitled Proposition A.

Local control, the Proposition A ballot initiative, received broad support, including St. Louis Mayor Francis Slay, and the Missouri Democratic Party On February 22, 2011, the House of Representatives passed House Bill 71, the local measure in that body, by a vote of 109–46. The bill went on the Senate,Senate Bill 23, which failed. Thus the ballot initiative was filed and on November 6, 2012, Proposition A passed with 63.9% to 36.1%.

Airport privatization 
Rex Sinquefield has been deeply involved in efforts to privatize the St. Louis Lambert International Airport. He split with Travis Brown, his former consultant, following the ballot initiative's withdrawal in 2020.

Philanthropy
Sinquefield and his family donate funds to a wide variety of organizations through the Sinquefield Charitable Foundation. The foundation has donated in particular to the Today and Tomorrow Education Foundation, the Children's Education Alliance of Missouri, the Special Learning Center, the Dual Masters Scholarship Program at Saint Louis University, the Chess Club and Scholastic Center of Saint Louis, World Chess Hall of Fame, and the Mizzou New Music Initiative.

In 2009, Sinquefield and his wife gave $1 million to the University of Missouri's School of Music. Those funds were used to create the New Music Initiative, an effort designed to encourage young people to become composers and to support new works of music composition. Sinquefield has contributed to the St. Vincent Home for Children.

In 2018, Sinquefield and his wife donated $50 million to Saint Louis University as part of the university's bicentennial celebration. The gift helped to fund a new Saint Louis University Research Institute and fund the construction of a new Interdisciplinary Science and Engineering building on SLU's campus. The gift was the largest single donation in Saint Louis University's history.

Sinquefield is a director of St. Vincent Home for Children in St. Louis, and a life trustee of DePaul University. He serves on the boards of Saint Louis University, the St. Louis Symphony, the St. Louis Art Museum, the Missouri Botanical Garden, the Contemporary Art Museum St. Louis, and the Chess Club and Scholastic Center of Saint Louis. He advises the Archdiocese of St. Louis on finance.

Saint Louis Chess Campus 
In 2007, Rex Sinquefield opened the Chess Club and Scholastic Center of Saint Louis, a non-profit organization. An educational organization, its mission is to "maintain a formal program of instruction to teach the game of chess and to promote and support its educational program through community outreach and local and national partnerships to increase the awareness of the educational value of chess." In August 2010, Sinquefield provided seed funding to move the World Chess Hall of Fame to St. Louis, citing the Chess Club's presence and reputation. The Sinquefield Cup is named after him.

In 2016, BBC News reported that Sinquefield, who likes chess “so much he's put tens of millions of dollars into the game,” turned St. Louis into a chess capital because he believes that chess can transform children and their academic lives.

Personal life 
He and his wife, Jeanne, met at the Judo Club at the University of Chicago. They have three children and worked together at DFA, where Jeanne ran the trading department.

Since their return to St. Louis, Sinquefield and his wife have divided their time between a 1,000-acre farm and a mansion in the Central West End. St. Louis Magazine said he showed people around the orphanage now called St. Vincent's Home for Children.

He is a devout Roman Catholic.

References

External links
 An interview with Rex Sinquefield explaining the investment philosophy he pioneered.
 An article on Sinquefield's receipt of the 1999 Distinguished Entrepreneurial Alumni award from the University of Chicago graduate school of business.
 Fortune article on Sinquefield's investment predictions.
 Article on Sinquefield's political activities in Missouri.
  Saint Louis Chess Club and Scholastic Center

1944 births
Living people
20th-century American businesspeople
21st-century American businesspeople
American chief executives of financial services companies
American financial analysts
American financial company founders
American financiers
American investors
American libertarians
American Roman Catholics
Businesspeople from St. Louis
Chess patrons
Missouri Botanical Garden people
Missouri Republicans
Saint Louis University alumni
University of Chicago Booth School of Business alumni